In 2017 Rhiannon Davies, her husband Richard  and two other bereaved parents, Kayleigh and Colin Griffiths asked the UK health secretary, Jeremy Hunt, to set up a public inquiry into maternity services at Shrewsbury and Telford Hospital NHS Trust. Though Hunt did not establish a public inquiry, he ordered a review in April 2017. In May 2017 Donna Ockenden was appointed chair of the review, and it initially investigated 23 cases of potentially significant concern .

As the review uncovered wider evidence of maternity services failings at the trust, with over 60 cases needing investigation, Davies called on Hunt's successor, Matt Hancock, to widen the review's remit. By Jun 2019 hundreds of cases were under investigation. In November 2019 the leaked interim report confirmed Davies' worst fears and vindicated her efforts:

When published in December 2020, the first Ockenden Report singled out the difference made by Davies, Stanton and two other bereaved parents, Kayleigh and Colin Griffiths:

In the House of Commons, Jeremy Hunt also paid tribute to the achievement of the grieving families, for overcoming a 'blame culture' to expose NHS failings.

As a consequence there was an agreement that mothers should not be put under pressure to have a natural birth when a Caesarean section would be safer.  However as James Titcombe and Nadine Montgomery pointed out, in the week the Ockenden report was published, NHS adverts were still producing messages that promote the role of midwives as ‘guardians of normal birth’.  As Lady Hale said in her judgement on Montgomery's case: some obstetricians feel "that a vaginal delivery is in some way morally preferable to a caesarean section: so much so that it justifies depriving the pregnant woman of the information needed for her to make a free choice."

The final report of The Ockenden review was published in March 2022 with wide ranging Local Actions For Learning for the local Trust and 15 Immediate and Essential Actions for maternity services across England.

References

External links
 Ockenden Report – Final (250 pages)
 Summary
National Health Service (England)
Maternity in the United Kingdom
Patient safety